According to the U.S. Census Bureau, as of 2020, New York was the fourth largest state in population after California, Texas, and Florida, with a population of 20,201,249, an increase of over 600,000 people, or 4.2%, since the year 2010. The population change between 2000–2006 includes a natural increase of 601,779 people (1,576,125 births minus 974,346 deaths) and a decrease due to net migration of 422,481 people out of the state. Immigration from outside the United States resulted in a net increase of 820,388 people, and migration within the country produced a net loss of about 800,213.

The distribution of change in population growth is uneven in New York State; the New York City metropolitan area is growing considerably, along with Saratoga County, and Western New York. The rest of the state is nearly stagnant. According to immigration statistics, the state is a leading recipient of migrants from around the globe. Since 2005, immigration failed to surpass emigration, a trend that was reversed since 2006. New York State lost two house seats in the 2011 congressional reapportionment, secondary to relatively slow growth when compared to the rest of the United States.

The center of population of New York is located in Orange County, in the town of Deerpark. Roughly 64% of the state's population lives in the New York City metropolitan area and 40% in New York City alone.

Population

Population

New York State has a primarily urban population. The largest city in the state is New York City, which is also one of the world's most ethnically diverse and cosmopolitan cities. Additional major urban centers include Albany, Buffalo, Rochester, Syracuse and Utica. The state has 62 counties; the most populated one is Kings County (Brooklyn).

The intense development, urbanization and suburban sprawl of New York City makes it the most populated region in New York and the collective U.S., an estimated 20 to 30 million in the eight-state Megalopolis stretching 500 miles from Boston to Washington, D.C., with New York City in the middle has 15 million residents in a 100-mile radius including Philadelphia (1.5 million in its city limits), northern New Jersey and Connecticut. A simple majority of New York's population lives within two hours of New York City. According to the July 1, 2004 Census Bureau Estimate, New York City and its six closest New York State satellite counties (Suffolk, Nassau, Westchester, Rockland, Putnam and Orange) have a combined population of 12,626,200 people, or 65.67% of the state's population.

Age

In age demographics: 6.5% of New York's population were under 5 years of age, 24.7% under 18, and 12.9% were 65 or older. Females made up 51.8% of the population. New York state has a fluctuating population growth rate, it has experienced some shrinkage in the 1970s and 1980s, but milder growth in the 1990s and the first decade of the 21st century.

Language

According to the 2000 U.S. Census, 13.61% of the population aged 5 and older speak Spanish at home, while 2.04% speak Chinese (including Cantonese and Mandarin), 1.65% Italian, and 1.23% Russian.

2020 Census
New York State in the 2020 Census had a population of 20,201,249 and the racial makeup was 52.5% Non-Hispanic White, 19.5% Hispanic or Latino, 14.8% black, 9.6% Asian, 0.7% Native American, and 0.1% Pacific Islander.

According to 2004 estimates, 20.4% of the population was foreign-born. Among cities in New York State, 36% of New York City's population is foreign-born; this figure of approximately 3 million is a higher total number of foreign-born residents than any other U.S. city. This number is often around 20% in other cities across New York.

In the 2000 Census, Italian Americans make up the largest ancestral ethnic group in Staten Island and Long Island, followed by Irish Americans and Polish Americans. Manhattan's leading ethnic ancestry group is Dominicans since the 2000 census, followed by Irish Americans, then Italian Americans and more than 200 ethnicities are counted, plus comparably large numbers of residents with Dutch, Portuguese, Greek, Russian, and Swedish ethnic ancestry. Albany and the Mohawk Valley-Central New York are heavily Irish American and Italian American. In Buffalo and Western New York, German Americans are the largest ethnic group, along with Polish Americans and other Slavic ethnic groups; in the northern tip of the state the largest ethnic background is that of French Canadians. New York State has a higher number of Italian-Americans than any other U.S. state. New York City is also said to be home to two million of Italian descent alone. NYC was once called home to the largest German, Greek, Irish, Italian, Polish and Russian communities outside their representative countries of origin.

Confusingly, the term American Jew is used to describe ethnic Jews by some demographers, and  religious identity (religious Jews, see: Judaism) of various nationalities and various denominations by others. Regardless, collectively most are American-born and are a major social presence in New York. An estimated 1 to 2 million alone in New York City and another 1 to 1.5 million live in surrounding areas, sometimes New York is referred to as the "world's largest Jewish city" since the mid-19th century. The first wave of Jewish immigrants in New York are of Sephardic origin, a scant 10,000 from the Netherlands, Italy, Spain and Portugal in the 17th and 18th centuries, but in the 19th century more newcomers were first German and finally in the early 20th century millions from Eastern Europe like Poland and Russia, both of Ashkenazi origin. In the late 20th century, a smaller wave of Russian Jews and Ukrainian Jews settled in the Brighton Beach section in Brooklyn, and New York has many Israeli-American residents.

New York contains the largest Puerto Rican population in the contiguous United States, concentrated in parts of New York City such as the Bronx, Brooklyn, and Manhattan. New York also has the largest Dominican population in the country, concentrated in New York City's Upper Manhattan and the Bronx. New York City is home to many with roots in Caribbean Islands like Jamaica, Barbados, Guyana, Trinidad and Haiti, as well as recent immigrants from Sub-Saharan African countries.

At 520,000 of New York State's over 600,000 Chinese Americans, New York City has a higher total number of Chinese Americans than Los Angeles County. New York also has the highest and growing proportion of Pakistani Americans and Bangladeshi Americans in the country, and a very high Indian American community, mainly concentrated in New York City.

US Racial-assignment System

As of the 2010 census, New York State has a population of 19,378,102. Broken down via US Census Racial classifications, this includes 12,740,974 (65.7%) white, 3,073,800 (15.9%) black, 1,420,244 (7.3%) Asian, 8,766 (0.0%) Pacific Islander, and 1,441,563 (7.4%) of other races. 585,849 (3.0%) have two or more races. Hispanics and Latinos of all "races" make up 3,416,922 (17.6%) of the state's population; non-Hispanic whites make up 58.3% of the state's population.

The Bronx has a large population of blacks that are of Latin American origin, but so does northern Manhattan (Harlem) and Brooklyn which had American-born black majorities since the 1920s, as well the largest African American population of any state. New York City has 1 million of New York State's 1.4 million Asian Americans.  Cities such as Buffalo and Rochester are predominantly made of African Americans, Hispanic, and various European and near-European ethnic groups. Southeast Asians, Eastern European and North/Central Asian, African and Caribbeans also have a noticeable presence.

Among New York State's cities, as of 2010 according to the US Racial System, New York City is 44% white(33%non hispanic white),28% Latino, 25% African American, and 13% percent Asian American. The city of Buffalo, New York's second-largest city, is 50% white (45% non-Hispanic white), 38% African American, 10% Latino, and 3% Asian American. The state capital of Albany is 57% white (64% non-Hispanic white), 30% African American, 8% Latino, and 5% Asian American.

Birth data
Note: Births in table don't add up, because Hispanics are counted both by their ethnicity and by their race, giving a higher overall number.

 Since 2016, data for births of White Hispanic origin are not collected, but included in one Hispanic group; persons of Hispanic origin may be of any race.

Immigration

Languages
The most common American English accents spoken, besides General American English, were the New York City area dialect (including New York City Latino English and North Jersey English), Hudson Valley English, the Western New England accent around Albany and Plattsburgh, Canadian English in the North Country and Inland Northern American English from Buffalo across much of the remaining Upstate New York area.

As of 2015, 70.72% (12,788,233) of New York residents age 5 and older spoke English at home as a primary language, while 14.44% (2,611,903) spoke Spanish, 2.61% (472,955) Chinese (which includes Cantonese and Mandarin), 1.20% (216,468) Russian, 1.18% (213,785) Italian, 0.79% (142,169) French Creole, 0.75% (135,789) French, 0.67% (121,917) Yiddish, 0.63% (114,574) Korean and 0.53% (95,413) Polish. In total, 29.28% (5,295,016) of New York's population aged 5 and older spoke a mother language other than English.

Religion

A 2014 survey found that the religious affiliations of the people of New York were:
 Christian – (combined 60%)
 Catholic – 31%
 Various Protestant denominations – 26%
 Other Christian denominations – 3%
 Non-Religious – 27%
 Jewish – 7%
 Muslim – 2%
 Buddhist – 1%
 Hindu – 1%
 Other Religions – 1%
 No response given/Unknown - 1%

1% of the people surveyed refused to answer.

See also
 Demographics of New York City
 Hispanics and Latinos in New York

References

 
New York